Solis station is a railway station located on the North Main Line in the city of Manila, Philippines.

After being abandoned for 20 years, and after nearly 10 years since the station's reconstruction, PNR reopened the Solis Station as part of Caloocan-Dela Rosa line, on August 1, 2018.

Due to nearly a decade of disuse since its rehabilitation, the station has been weathered and its gate barriers have been vandalized, and in the case of its westbound barrier, dismantled and possibly stolen. It did not have running electricity until after its reactivation.

This station was closed to rail traffic on 1997. On 2009, the station's new platforms were constructed but it was never opened until 2018 where it is once again active with the launching of the Caloocan-Dela Rosa shuttle line.

Notes
Solis, C-3 and Asistio Avenue stations originally lies on the old Manila-Dagupan Line, later the Manila-San Fernando Line, also known as the Main Line North. It will be revived as part of the revitalized Northrail that will initially serve Clark and Subic, and may eventually be rebuilt to revisit its original destination.

Rail skates and rickshaws run along the line, providing an alternate source of transportation, though before the construction of NLEX Segment 10.1. This was the only line to travel to the Caloocan railway depot.

Station Layout

References

Philippine National Railways stations
Railway stations in Metro Manila
Buildings and structures in Tondo, Manila